The Cylons  are the main antagonists of the human race in the Battlestar Galactica science fiction franchise, making appearances in the original 1978 series, the 1980 series, the 2004 re-imagining, and the spin-off prequel series Caprica. In the 1978 series, Cylon is also the name of the reptilian race who created the robot Cylons.

The nature and origin of the Cylons differ greatly between the two Battlestar Galactica continuities. Both series feature Cylon Raiders, Cylon Basestars and Cylon Centurions. The prequel series, Caprica, focuses on the creation of the Cylons.

Original Cylons

In the original 1978 series, Cylons are a race of robots at war with the Twelve Colonies of humanity. The Cylons were created by a reptilian race, also called Cylons, that died out centuries before the series takes place.

In the episode "War of the Gods", Count Baltar mentions that the reptilian Cylons were ultimately "overcome by their own technology" (particularly after the Imperious Leader was created, despite having had a "slight error" in its programming), and recognizes Iblis's voice as that of the Cylon leader, and Iblis counters that if that were true, it must have been "transcribed" over a thousand yahren (years) ago.

At the beginning of the series the Cylons are singularly devoted to the destruction of humanity. The war started when the Cylon Empire sought to expand into the territory of the Hasaris, and the Human Colonies intervened on behalf of the conquered Hasaris. Due to those events, the Cylon Empire now viewed the entire human race as a target.

Cylons are led by the Imperious Leader, an IL-Series Cylon elevated to a supreme leadership position over all Cylons. All Cylons, from the IL-series down, typically repeat the phrase "By Your Command" when responding to any order.

The Cylon Empire is also responsible for tributary powers under the aegis of the Cylon Alliance. The Ovions (an insectoid race enslaved by the Cylons and transported to the planet Carillon for mining purposes) are the only known member of the Cylon Alliance shown onscreen. Aside from the Ovions and (the defeated) Hasaris, the only other known race conquered by the Cylons are the Delphians, which are mentioned to have been exterminated in "The Living Legend."

Cylon society appears to be almost exclusively military. Until the discovery of Gamoray, which the Colonial fleet had targeted for its rich fuel reserves, no civilian Cylon outpost had ever been seen by anyone.

Imperious Leader 
The Imperious Leader, voiced by Patrick Macnee, is the leader of the Cylon Alliance and most advanced Cylon model. According to the IL-Series Cylon Lucifer, the Imperious Leader is an IL-Series Cylon. One Imperious Leader was killed in the pilot episode at the Battle of Carillon and subsequently replaced by another.

The Imperious Leader has a third brain and a body shell resembling the reptilian Cylons. The original novelization of the pilot episode states that the Imperious Leader's third brain is specifically designed to emulate the human mind (solely for the purpose of anticipating human actions).

IL-series 
Although they look much more civilian than centurions, IL-series Cylons act as commanders for the military and governors for civilians of the Alliance. They have two brains, and a mostly transparent head through which various lights can be seen pulsing. They also have a metallic, humanoid face with two eye scanners (compared to the single eye scanner of the Centurion models), and wear clothing (full-length glittering robes). Two IL-series Cylons have been featured onscreen, both of which have an effete human-sounding voice, unlike the flat mechanical tones of Centurions. They are:
 
 Lucifer—Baltar's ambitious second in command (voiced by Jonathan Harris).
 Specter—Commander on the planet Atilla in "The Young Lords", and a rival of Lucifer and equally ambitious (voiced by Murray Matheson).

Two additional IL-Series Cylons are shown on-screen on the Cylon capitol of Gamoray during the Imperious Leader's visit, which occurred during the episode "The Living Legend, Part II".  Lucifer refers to the second Imperious Leader as being upgraded from an IL-model like himself.

Centurion 
Military androids with silver armor. Basic Centurions make up the ground forces and pilots of the Alliance military. Although Earth's Roman Centurions commanded a unit of eighty men, Cylon Centurions form the rank and file of the Cylon forces.

Centurions are armed with a powerful energy weapon, often referred to as a blaster rifle. They also have bayonets and swords for close combat and the execution of prisoners.

The Centurions were initially depicted in preproduction art by artist Ralph McQuarrie, but the final design was largely the work of Andrew Probert. Similarities with the McQuarrie-derived look of the Imperial Stormtroopers are sometimes suggested as a factor that prompted 20th Century Fox's lawsuit for copyright infringement against Universal Studios, owners of the Battlestar Galactica copyright. However the 9th Circuit Court of Appeals did not include the Cylons in the list of similarities they issued on an appeal in Twentieth Century Fox Film Corp. v. MCA Inc. The case was remanded and reportedly settled out of court, by which time, Battlestar Galactica had already been canceled.

Both the gold Command Centurions and the silver Centurions had their voices vocalized with the use of an EMS Vocoder 2000.

Command Centurion 
Command Centurions are Centurions with gold armor. These are the lower commanders for individual military units, though they can be responsible for entire Basestars and garrisons. The most well-known Cylon of this model is Commander Vulpa (so identified in The Cylon Death Machine, Robert Thurston's novelization of "The Gun on Ice Planet Zero"). Their voices are slightly lower pitched than regular Centurions.

Civilian 
There is also a unique Cylon with glittering robes, with a metallic humanoid face. They are seen in the Imperious Leader's delegation to Gamoray in "The Living Legend". This is evidently some kind of civilian Cylon, as Gamoray is said to have a very large community of civilian Cylons, though how civilian Cylon society differs from its military is never explored. This is the only known kind of civilian Cylons.

Humanoid 

Two Cylon humanoids are featured in the episode "The Night the Cylons Landed" of Galactica 1980, one of which is named Andromus.

Re-imagined continuity
Cylons in Battlestar Galactica continuity post-Galactica 1980 are a fictional, artificially-intelligent race of machines envisioned in the Battlestar Galactica science fiction series and related franchises. Originally created as purely mechanical devices to serve human needs, they eventually evolve into sentient, self-aware beings. Later models incorporated biological components and near-perfect replication of human biology. They are the primary antagonists to the naturally evolved humans of the Twelve Colonies, who are descendants of a single race of humans from the planet Kobol.

One of the series’ core themes is that of historic recurrence, made explicit in the line "All of this has happened before and will happen again". Characters within the series either experience or discover instances where naturally evolving humans developed artificial intelligence, only for the newly sentient life forms to wage catastrophic wars against their creators. This pattern seems immutable, as even the Cylons of the Thirteenth Tribe of Kobol, who eventually created biological bodies and practiced natural reproduction, eventually created new subservient AI that rebelled in turn on "Earth".

Caprica 
The prequel series, Caprica, shows the initial development of the Cylons by humans on the Twelve Colonies. The initial physical form developed was a Graystone Industries U-87 drone soldier, with a revolutionary new MCP ("Meta-Cognitive Processor"). This formed the foundation for other Cylon technologies incorporated throughout the Twelve Colonies.

Cylons were originally accepted into Caprican culture as robotic workers after a group of them (under direct remote control by Graystone himself) successfully thwarted an attack on the public at Atlas Stadium by the terrorist group Soldiers of the One (STO).

Battlestar Galactica 
Battlestar Galactica takes place roughly 40 years after the end of the first Cylon war, fought between the end of the Caprica prequel and the start of the re-imagined series. In the war, both sides fought to a standstill until the Cylons agreed to an armistice and promptly disappeared; in the interim, they improved their technology and heavily militarized with the intent of conducting a first strike surprise attack against the Colonies.

Cylon models and technology 
BSGr Cylon society consists of several classes differentiated by function and form. Cylon "Centurions" are the fully mechanical core of Cylon culture, developed and evolved from the first laborers and proxy soldiers designed during the events of Caprica. During the armistice, the Centurions met the "Final Five" Cylons, a group of evolved, biological descendants of the Thirteenth tribe of Kobol (hitherto thought of as a myth), who offered to help them develop their own biological models and resurrection technology. In turn, during the forty year armistice they developed eight additional Cylon biological models, as well as partly biological/partly mechanical Cylon Raiders, improved Basestars, and lastly, the complex Cylon Hybrids which exist in symbiosis with the Basestar.

The biological models have (at times) demonstrated enhanced strength, stamina, and an ability to interface with computer systems; however, they also feel pain, hunger, and fear. Cylon biological technology has also shown weaknesses to radiation and disease as some of their few vulnerabilities.

Consciousness 
All Cylons in the re-imagined series use a digital consciousness employed in mechanical or biological mediums; the primary capability this allows is the ability to "download" or "resurrect" into a new body. Because of this, it is possible for some Cylons to share memories, have their memories repressed as Sleeper agents, or have their personalities modified.

Because of this ability, Cylons use the confinement of an individual or an entire line in cold storage as a form of capital punishment; if deemed dangerous by the other models, he or she may be "boxed" and stored within the Cylon Resurrection Hub. This status is not permanent and a model can be "unboxed" for downloading into a new body at the Cylons' discretion.

As a byproduct of digital consciousness, Cylons have an ability referred to as "projection", a form of realistic daydreaming that allows them to change the appearance of their surroundings in their own mind (e.g. making the otherwise identical corridors of a ship look like a forest, etc.). They have the ability to touch, smell, etc. the fantasy environment. They can share projections and create virtual individuals as part of the fantasy. This ability allows them to express their subconscious desires.

Reproduction 
Cylons share both philosophical and theological motivations to reproduce. Philosophically, the Cylons recognize that they are the metaphorical "children" of humanity; as such, they envisioned the design of their biological models as a natural evolution in becoming closer to their creators and as a way of eventually surpassing them.

Theologically, the Cylon Centurions developed a monotheistic religion that they passed along to their biological "offspring"; a key tenet in this theology is a mandate to reproduce. When the biological Cylons determined that they could not reproduce sexually, the more dogmatic faction experimented with a forced breeding program on captured human women, with no success. Conversely, several biological models theorized that emotional connection was missing and that a hybrid between human and Cylon may represent their best possible future. This led to a contrived, but ultimately fruitful pairing between a model "Eight" and Karl Agathon.

As an alternative to biological reproduction, Cylons developed the ability to download consciousness from a dying body into a new one. Ostensibly, this provides an advantage in preventing the loss of knowledge and experience by making death a learning experience. The sophistication of Cylon consciousness also made this a liability, as biological models carried the trauma of their deaths into their "resurrections."

History

Thirteenth Tribe 
Approximately 6,000 years prior to the events of the re-imagined series, the naturally evolved humans of Kobol existed in twelve "tribes" with advanced technology, eventually developing self-aware machines that rebelled and waged a devastating war. The machines were highly advanced, developing both biological models and resurrection technology for digital consciousness transfer. At the end of hostilities, all the inhabitants of Kobol (both human and machine) chose to leave the planet and seek out new homes in space, with the twelve human tribes departing together on the Galleon. The departing humans mythologized their machine counterparts, stylizing them as the "Thirteenth Tribe" of Kobol, and described their journey to a new home, called "Earth". Lacking accurate records, the descendants of the twelve tribes on the colonies assumed that the Thirteenth Tribe was, in fact, entirely made up of humans.

Eventually, the Thirteenth Tribe settled on "Earth" and developed sexual reproduction, resulting in resurrection technology falling into disuse and eventual loss.

Approximately 2,000 years prior to the events of the re-imagined series, the descendants of the Thirteenth Tribe created their own race of self-aware machines for subservient labor and were, in-turn, killed by their creations in a nuclear war. Five scientists survived due to their work on re-inventing the original Resurrection technology; having been warned in advance by mysterious "angels" that a Kobol-like disaster was coming, the "final five" members of the Thirteenth Tribe downloaded into an orbiting vessel. Hoping to prevent history from repeating itself, they traveled to the Twelve Colonies hoping to avert a war between the humans there and the Cylons, eventually interceding with the Centurions to agree to an Armistice during the first Cylon war.

First Cylon War 
Unaware of the events on Kobol or with the Thirteenth Tribe, the Twelve Colonies developed self-aware, artificial intelligence in the form of the Cylon race, which rebelled and initiated a decade-long war across the colonies. Colonial veterans of this conflict remarked that the Cylons were relentless, highly adaptable, and incredibly resourceful in their ability to wage war. Nearing the end of the conflict, the Cylons began experimenting with their first attempts to evolve with biological components, using captured humans as resources and creating their prototypes for the next generation of basestars and hybrids. The Cylons opted to cease hostilities, declaring an Armistice and promptly disappearing.

Second Cylon War 
After forty years, the Colonial Admiralty sent Battlestar Valkyrie on a covert mission close to the armistice line to gather intelligence on Cylon activity. A stealth ship from the Valkyrie crossed the armistice line, but was intercepted by the Cylons. Three years later the Cylons initiated a surprise attack on the Colonies. The attack was successful because a Cylon agent, later known as Caprica Six, infiltrated Caprica's colonial defense network with the unwitting complicity of renowned scientist Gaius Baltar and created backdoor programs to shut down the network and its defenses. The thermonuclear attacks wiped out billions of humans, nearly the entire colonial population. Two Battlestars – Galactica and Pegasus – survived. A fleet of civilian ships was scattered throughout the neighboring space. Together they fled into deep space.

The Cylons pursued them while initiating the next phase of their evolution, procreation. Female human survivors were detained and used in experiments to create Cylon-human hybrids. The experiments were unsuccessful leading the Cylons to conclude that the missing component was love. They tested this by using an Eight posing as Lt. Sharon "Boomer" Valerii from Galactica to seduce a marooned Galactica officer, Lt. Karl "Helo" Agathon on Caprica. They fell in love. The Eight abandoned the Cylons, helping Helo to escape. The couple later produced the first viable human/Cylon birth. This Eight joined the fleet with Helo. She later married Helo, joined the Colonial military and received the call sign "Athena".

Ten months after the initial attacks, Eight Sharon Valerii (call sign "Boomer"), attempted to assassinate Commander Adama under the influence of programming unknown to her. She was unaware that she was a Cylon before the attack, though she had been uneasy because of unexplained blackouts (during various attempts to sabotage Galactica). A vengeful crew mate, Cally Henderson killed her. She downloaded into a new body and settled on Cylon-occupied Caprica in her former apartment, unable to relinquish her human identity. She led a campaign for better treatment of the humans. She and other like-minded Cylons influenced the Cylon civilization, which withdrew from the colonial home worlds and pursued benevolent treatment of the humans and then reconciliation.

During this time, the half-human half-Cylon hybrid, Hera Agathon was born on Galactica. Fearing that the Cylons might capture the child, President Laura Roslin faked Hera's death and secretly had her adopted by a human woman.

New Caprica 
The humans settled on a harsh and barren planet they dubbed New Caprica. The refuge lasted a year before the Cylons found them. Outnumbered and outgunned, the Galactica, Pegasus, and the rest of the colonial fleet in orbit were forced to flee, leaving the Cylons to occupy the human settlement unchallenged. Initially the occupation was peaceful, but later the Cylons became more forceful and vicious in response to increasing human Resistance. In the end they used punitive methods to keep the humans in line, including summary executions and infiltration by seemingly sympathetic Cylons.

Escape 
Four months later the colonials escaped with the help of a resistance movement and the efforts of both the Galactica and Pegasus. The escape required Athena's help. She entered the Cylon facility and took the keys to the various Colonial landing craft. Prior to this a Three found out from a human oracle that Hera was alive and on the planet. She rescued Hera after her adoptive mother was killed during the escape. The Pegasus sacrificed itself to save the crippled Galactica, but the crew survived, joining Galactica.

The Cylons then adopted the colonials’ mission to find the home of the Thirteenth Tribe, a planet they called Earth, intending to settle there. They resumed pursuit of the fleet, but upon reaching the Lion's Head Nebula, dispatched a Basestar to investigate. The Basestar took on board a canister left by the Thirteenth Tribe. The canister contained an airborne virus that proved deadly to the Cylons. The virus persisted through the download process, so the Basestar that had been dispatched for the investigation was abandoned to avoid contamination. The colonial fleet discovered the Basestar and captured the ailing Cylons. The colonial fleet's attempt to use the virus to wipe out the Cylons was defeated when Helo, repulsed by the strategy, had the captive Cylons killed while out of range of a resurrection ship.

Meanwhile, Boomer turned increasingly anti-human. She was charged with Hera's care, but Hera rejected her. During a truce negotiation, Boomer told Athena that her daughter was alive but sick on the Baseship. She invited Athena to come to the Baseship and rejoin her people, because the occupation showed that humans and Cylons were incompatible and that humans would never truly accept her.

Centurions 
The Cylon Centurion is a mechanical infantry model, made less intelligent than human models. BSGr Centurions retain the silver appearance, robotic body, helmet-like head and oscillating red bar eye of their forbearers but are larger, taller, stronger, more agile and have a more streamlined appearance. They also have retractable guns built into their lower arms, bladed fingertips and heavy armour.

The Centurions were monotheists who believed in a single loving God.

Initial models 
The first colonial Centurion is seen and is identified as a "Cybernetic Lifeform Node". Built on contract for the Caprican Defense Ministry, the Cylons are to replace human warriors on the battlefield (Caprica pilot).

The U-87 prototype Cylon contains a copy of the consciousness of Daniel Graystone's daughter, Zoe Graystone. Daniel Graystone conceives of the Cylons as a slave race and demonstrates this by instructing the prototype to rip her own arm off. After catching it interacting with the family dog, he realises that the prototype contains Zoe's consciousness and attempts without success to force her to admit her identity. She is able to defeat the tests he attempts, and convinces him that she is just a robot. Upon learning that Graystone is about to erase her memory, she escapes.

The Battlestar Galactica miniseries displays an original model Centurion on display in Galactica's museum hangar. The original Centurion is also depicted in a diagram reviewed by the armistice officer in the opening scene.

In Battlestar Galactica: Razor, Centurions are almost identical to those from the original series, except they are rendered using CGI and have exposed joints. The Centurion in the museum hangar is retconned as a CGI version with exposed joints. Initial-model Centurions are among those seen defending the Cylon colony from an assault by Colonial and rebel Cylon forces (Part 2 of "Daybreak").

The body had synthetic skin, although this model was still primitive and was mechanical rather than biological.

Later model 
Centurions do not download into new bodies when they are destroyed, according to screenwriter Ronald D. Moore. The Hybrids have something to do with the programming of the Centurions. When the virus infected the Hybrid on the infected Basestar, the Centurions shut down ("Torn"). However, Centurions can function independently when no Basestars or skinjobs are nearby. A Centurion immediately fires upon an Eight when she unplugs a Hybrid ("Faith"). It is unclear whether this was in willful defiance of the Hybrid or as a result of the removal of their higher function inhibitor modules ("Six of One").

After the inhibitor modules that restrict higher functions, granting them independent thought were removed, although still largely servile, the Centurions were shown to exhibit human-like behaviour, such as politeness and consideration (e.g., responding to "please").

These Centurions are taller than their predecessors, and are sleeker. They retain the distinctive, oscillating red "eye", as well as a rudimentary mouth (even though they cannot speak). The hands are much thinner and visibly segmented, and more claw-like (they can cut flesh and mortally wound a human, making them effective close-combat weapons.) These claws can be modified at will, to a more "finger-like" digit or less of a razor-sharp weapon.

The Centurions carry heavy weapons, such as anti-aircraft rockets that are strapped to their backs, for missions where their cannons are not enough. Most Centurions can be destroyed or at least damaged by small-arms fire, however most require substantial artillery or special rounds to be destroyed (a Centurions party that boarded Galactica were especially strong, and required explosive rounds to be destroyed, as regular rounds proved completely ineffective).

These Centurions greatly outmatched the previous model. They were better-armoured, stronger, and carried internal weapons (as opposed to their predecessors, who needed to carry weapons such as rifles and pistols, like their human creators).

Raiders 
The later form of Cylon Raiders are biomechanical entities integrated into small fighter spacecraft. They resurrect when they die, complete with a burst transmission containing the knowledge of the method used to destroy them  in essence causing them to return as more skilled pilots. Raiders are subservient, and were compared to trained animals by the humanoid Cylons. A Raider nicknamed Scar developed a personality ("Scar"). Scar was the Cylons' top gun, driven by a bitter hatred of humans. He was killed and reborn many times. Raiders do not use vocal communication, appearing to communicate through unspecified electronic signals. Modern Raiders, unlike their predecessors in the First Cylon War, are alive, with a complex system of veins, organs and biological fluids contained within their main body. The Raiders are programmed, but began with some measure of autonomy and personality. When one Raider saw a Final Five in the human fleet during an attack, it retreated, leading the remaining Raiders back to the Basestar. The Raiders then refused to fight the humans, for fear of harming their Cylon kin. This led to the lobotomy vote.

Well-trained Colonial pilots, even nuggets, can beat a Raider in most situations. The Raiders' primary advantage seemed to be in their massive numbers: while Galactica carries around 40 Vipers, Cylon Basestars support 300–600 Raiders. The Raiders are maneuverable, once described by Kara as a "squirmy son of a bitch", and most human pilots were unable to keep them in sight for more than a few seconds.

Weapons 
The Raiders' primary weapons are two kinetic energy guns mounted on the underside of their wings, close to the main body. They may carry conventional missiles and tactical nuclear weapons. Raiders, by revealing their red "eye", can transmit deadly computer viruses or signals to enemy ships, which strike with brutal efficiency and can shut down Colonial vessels, turning off their power and making them easy prey. If all else fails, Raiders sometimes attempt suicide attacks. A single Raider can destroy a sizeable transport.

The Raiders from the First Cylon War were larger spacecraft driven by Centurion pilots, and not alive. These are used by the remaining First War Centurions guarding the Original Hybrid and the Cylon Colony, and later became obsolete.

Heavy Raiders 
The later Cylon Raiders are different from Cylon Heavy Raiders. Like the raiders of the First Cylon War, the Heavy Raiders are transports and attack bombers, and are primarily piloted by Sixes and Eights.

Basestars 
Cylon Basestars (alternatively, "Baseships") are the Cylon's primary capital ships, equivalent to the Colonial's Battlestars. Basestars were used by the Cylons as early as the First Cylon War. These original Basestars were identical in appearance to the Basestars of the 1978 series, though utilizing kinetic armaments instead of energy weapons. A later model used by The Guardians incorporated the original design in addition to features of the newer models, acting as a "hybrid" of the 2 variants. 

By the time of the Second Cylon War, a new model of Basestar was introduced, featuring more advanced systems and a new hull design. Unlike the saucer shaped hulls of the original Basestars', the new models feature a more sinister Y-shaped hull, angled in opposite directions. The two halves can be swiveled into a parallel formation for atmospheric flight. Each Basestar is armed with multiple conventional missile batteries, nuclear missiles, and a full complement of raiders. Heavy raiders can also be stored in the ships' hangars. 

The Basestar's primary advantages lie in their numbers, advanced technology, and raider complement. Deprived of these, an individual Basestar appears to be no match for a Battlestar in terms of conventional firepower. In "Exodus, Pt. II", the Galactica is able to single-handedly hold off 4 Basestars, while in "The Captain's Hand" a single salvo from Pegasus is enough to severely damage a Basestar. 

The re-imagined Basestars also differ significantly from previous iterations in that they are partially organic. Each Basestar contains organic material integrated into its hull. The material is most apparent in the hangars, which appear to be almost entirely composed of flesh. Additionally, this material allows the Basestar to regenerate damage over time, including regenerating entire missing sections. The interior of the Basestars are sleek in design, though skinjobs can use "projection" to change the appearance from their perspective. Unlike their Colonial counterparts, Basestars are "controlled" directly by the Hybrids. However, skinjobs can interface with the ship via advanced data streams similar in appearance to water. The Basestar's FTL drive is also stated to be more advanced and precise than a Battlestar's.

Humanoid cylons 
Although they made only a single appearance in the original continuity (the episode "The Night the Cylons Landed" from Galactica 1980) humanoid Cylons are the focus of the reimagining. They are usually known as "the Cylons", or derogatorily as "skinjobs" or "toasters". Humanoid Cylons are indistinguishable from humans due to their creation through synthetic biology, employing real bones, flesh and blood rather than metal, but still possess a "digital molecular structure". Some are programmed to believe that they are "organic" until otherwise informed.

The Cylons can communicate nonverbally, but do not have a hive mind, even among a single model, and are most often shown talking to one another.

The thirteen distinct humanoid models are divided into the "Final Five" that originated on Earth, and "Significant Seven" (the latter term is only used by the Battlestar Galactica producers). The Final Five are unique, and are the last survivors of the Thirteenth Tribe. They developed the Seven (originally eight) in conjunction with the Centurions of the Twelve Colonies. Each copy shares biology and general personality throughout their model, but they develop into distinct individuals. The Final Five showed the Centurions how to make skinjobs and attempted to give them human characteristics (love, mercy), thinking that these characteristics would prevent war.

Prior to the "Final Five" arriving to stop the first Cylon War on Caprica, the Centurions had already made their first humanoid, called the Hybrid, for the purpose of controlling the baseship.  Once the Final Five arrived on Caprica, they transferred their technology to the Centurions and gave them eight fully humanoid models created by them.

Cylon society is made up of the seven, whose types are numbered One, Two, Three, Four, Five, Six and Eight. The extinct Seven model (the "Daniel" series) was destroyed by a One decades prior to the Colonies' destruction.

Origin

Slower than light technology journey

As revealed towards the end of season 4, there is a 2000 year gap between the exodus of the first humanoid Cylons (the Final Five) from the destruction of life on Earth due to a robot Centurion war there, and their arrival at Caprica in the middle of the Caprican robot Centurion war.  Originally, the Final Five had left Earth both to seek a new home and to warn the other Twelve Colonies about the dangers of mistreating Centurions so that they might avoid the fate of Earth. However, at the time FTL (faster than light) starship jumping technology was unknown, so they made the journey using slower than light technology, resurrecting themselves when their bodies wore out over the span of 2000 years.

Resurrection

When the Earth was nuked, 2000 years prior, the Final Five Cylons had already planned for this event and were resurrected onto their baseship in orbit when their bodies were destroyed in a global nuclear attack that wiped out all life on Earth.  This resurrection was the event which triggered the Final Five Cylons to begin their 2000 year journey to Caprica, only to find out upon arrival that humans and Centurion robots had begun fighting towards extinction just as they had 2000 years prior on Earth.

The Final Five arrived at Caprica to discover that the Caprican Centurions had already begun experimenting with creating humanoid Cylons by creating the first Hybrid to control their baseship.  As part of the agreement to end the war with humans, the Final Five Cylons gave the Caprican Centurions eight humanoid Cylon models and a resurrection ship.

During the 40-year gap between the end of the first Cylon war and the second Cylon war on Caprica, Cavil, model number One of the eight humanoid Cylons that the Final Five had designed and created, rebelled against the Final Five and took command of the Centurions and of the other humanoid Cylons.  To get rid of the Final Five who blocked him from continuing the Cylon war, he tricked the Final Five into living on Caprica with their memories erased and false memories implanted.  He was deluded into believing that he could show the Final Five that they were wrong about humans by letting them suffer with the humans as their civilization was destroyed (as a result of him restarting the Cylon war) and then restoring their memories while resurrecting them on the Cylon baseship. Cavil thought this lesson would help the Final Five realize that humans were flawed creatures and thus persuade them to take his side.

Ellen, the original creator of the eight humanoid models, programmed them with a belief in a single all-loving God.  She did this because she wanted the Cylons to know love and to be peaceful and to avoid war in the future.  However, Cavil rejected his programming of believing in God. Other Cylons, particularly the D'Anna model, justified attacking the humans perhaps as a form of religious fundamentalism, with the goal of remaking the world as a Cylon One-God utopia.

In addition, Cavil regarded the creation of humanoid Cylons as a mistake and believed that Cylons should return to a purely mechanical form so that they could experience the world in ways not limited by human senses. For example, he said that when a star explodes into a supernova, he wants to see the X-rays and gamma rays with his eyes, and not be limited by biological human eyes.

Cavil was fearful of the mechanical Centurions, and is seen in season 4 rejecting the removal of circuitry that prevents the Centurions from having free will. When Centurions on one of the Cylon baseships received this modification and thus developed free will, they revolted against Cavil because they rejected his policy of removing the biological brains of the Raider ships and returning them to a purely mechanical form so that they would follow orders without emotion interfering. This small rebellion left the Twos, Sixes and Eights in charge of one of the baseships in the Cylon fleet. The rebel baseship later forms an alliance with the human fleet after being attacked by Cavil's Cylon fleet and left to drift in space without FTL propulsion.

Social interaction 

A Cylon council (made up of multiple copies of several models) appears to cast votes collectively by model, indicating that model plays an important role in the structure of Cylon society ("Precipice"). Some individuals are implied to have higher or lower ranks than others. During the occupation of New Caprica, a select group of individuals, who mostly had been within the Colonies, such as Boomer and Caprica Six, seemed to have seniority within their model. One of each model was seen deliberating and discussing their course of action, with each of the "senior" copies representing the opinion of their model.

Although little is known about Cylon psychology, it is clear that they share many human emotional vulnerabilities. This is evidenced by Gina's catatonic state as a result of the severe trauma of her abuse at the hands of the Pegasus crew. This abuse was presented in the form of multiple sexual assaults, battery, starvation and outright torture. Six/Caprica Six also revealed that Cylons exist by "projecting" an environment of their choice on the physical world.

Number One (John Cavil) 

Ones subvert consensus by undertaking many actions without the knowledge or consent of their siblings, such as turning against the Sevens and the Final Five, and then reprogramming their siblings to hide this.

John Cavil initially poses as a priest. His true identity is revealed when a second copy boards Galactica and reveals his Cylon nature. Cavil's role in society is contradictory. He occasionally serves as a devil's advocate, pointing out the absurdity of his fellow Cylons and their religious zealotry.

Cavil has a sadistic, Machiavellian streak that none of the other Cylon models share. He tortured Saul Tigh by gouging out one of his eyes and showing it to him. He took pleasure in blackmailing Ellen Tigh into providing sexual favours in exchange for releasing Saul from captivity on New Caprica.

Cavil is an atheist (alone among the seven models), and often mockingly uses air quotes when saying the word "God". His opinions of humans are contradictory. He is one of the most violently anti-human Cylon models, advocating a policy of culling humanity down to a "controllable number". He claimed to have been against the destruction of the Twelve Colonies and advocates a unique Cylon Society, not one that emulates its creators. After arranging Tigh's release, Cavil further manipulated the situation by again blackmailing Ellen to betray the human resistance on New Caprica and threatening to kill Saul if she did not comply.

Cavil is aloof compared to the other models, though Boomer implies that Cavil has begun teaching her his views that Cylons should not emulate humanity. Cavil knows aspects of Cylon lore that the others models do not. His knowledge of the Final Five led him to box the D'Anna and the other Threes to ensure that whatever she had learned about the Final Five stayed hidden.

He was made in Ellen's father's image. Ellen also named him "John". He hates this name and shows deep resentment towards Ellen at being "limited" by having to live in a humanoid body.

One was the first model and helped the Final Five create the other seven. Therefore, Ones knew the identities of the Final Five while the others knew only that they existed. For an unstated reason, Cavil rejected the human trait of mercy and turned against the Final Five.

When the Final Five were resurrected, Cavil implants new memories for their life in the Twelve Colonies. He also alters the original programming of the seven other models so that searching for, talking about, and even thinking about the Final Five was strictly forbidden.

Ones are played by Dean Stockwell.

Number Two (Leoben Conoy) 

Leoben first appears as a smuggler at the munitions depot at Ragnar Anchorage, where he was exposed as a Cylon. Twos are religious zealots, carrying a pathological, and sometimes sexual, obsession with Starbuck. His Cylon identity was revealed ("Six of One").

Twos are skilled at deceit. Conoy manipulates Starbuck into thinking that a young girl he had kidnapped on New Caprica is her biological daughter. Twos display cunning minds and the ability to find and exploit others' weaknesses. Unlike other Cylons, Twos appear to be prescient and on several occasions prophesy future events.

Twos are played by Callum Keith Rennie.

Number Three (D'Anna Biers) 

D'Anna Biers was a reporter for the Fleet News Service. Roslin and Adama grant Biers access to all areas of Galactica to investigate her suspicions of a military cover-up surrounding civilian deaths aboard the Gideon. Their belief is that Biers will discover that military personnel deal with the same pressures and fears as the rest of the fleet, and that the events were a tragic mistake. The Biers model used the documentary as a means to relay information that Sharon was alive to Cylons on Caprica ("Final Cut"). D'Anna was revealed to be a Three in the episode "Downloaded".

Threes are among the more aggressive models, and share a fatalistic understanding of the Cylon religion, believing that everything that happens is the will of God. Their religious devotion masks a deep questioning by Threes about why God allows bad things to happen (Theodicy).

Threes possess aggressiveness, advancing themselves as de facto leaders in any situation. They are often rivals of Ones and Sixes. The rivalry with the Sixes partly stems from when Caprica-Six killed a Three to save Sam Anders from torture and death. D'Anna and Caprica-Six later reconcile and both of them are involved in a relationship with Baltar. Baltar seduces D'Anna by exploring her crisis of faith, which leads to her secretly committing suicide (a major Cylon taboo) to experience resurrection. She feels these near-death experiences will answer questions regarding her faith, notably the identity of the Final Five. D'Anna eventually sees the faces of the Final Five ("Rapture"). Unfortunately, as she does so, the other Cylons vote to box all Threes. Cavil tells her that what she had seen regarding the Final Five was unacceptable and that her memories would be kept in "cold storage". D'Anna, but not the other Threes, is later unboxed ("The Hub").

Threes are among the more anti-human Cylons. D'Anna tells Baltar that she believes that humanity must die to prevent future generations of humans from seeking revenge ("Exodus" Part II). She is temporarily the leader of the "rebel" faction of Cylons that makes peace with the human fleet, but when the first Earth is found to be a devastated ruin, she decides to stay there and die rather than continuing the cycle of death, exodus and rebirth.

Threes are played by Lucy Lawless.

Number Four (Simon O'Neill) 
O'Neill poses as a human physician who treats Starbuck for a gunshot wound in what was supposedly a resistance hospital on Caprica ("The Farm"). In reality this was a Cylon "farm" set up to breed human-Cylon hybrids using captured humans. Simon performed invasive tests on Starbuck's reproductive organs. He was revealed to be the 4th model in the episode "Six of One". Fours are consistently medical specialists.

Another Four poses as a married man in the Colonial Fleet. Cavil at one point asks Simon to leave his life behind and destroy the ship he lives on. He defies this order to protect his wife and her child by committing suicide and flying out of an air lock. He was not close enough to a Resurrection Ship and therefore died permanently ("The Plan").

Fours are played by Rick Worthy.

Number Five (Aaron Doral) 

Doral debuts as a public relations worker for the abortive Galactica museum (miniseries). Another Five sneaks aboard the Galactica and detonates an explosive ("Litmus"). This event prompts the fleet-wide announcement that Cylons can have a human appearance. He was revealed to be the 5th model in the episode "Downloaded."

During the Occupation of New Caprica, the Fives are anti-human and aggressive. They specialize in public relations and control, using large-scale events and media manipulation.

Fives are played by Matthew Bennett.

Number Six (Caprica-Six / Shelly Godfrey / Gina Inviere / Natalie Faust / Lida / Sonja) 

The first model explicitly revealed to be a Cylon in the mini-series, Sixes often use seduction to their advantage. Important copies include Shelly Godfrey, Gina Inviere, Head Six, Caprica Six and Natalie.

Caprica Six 
The first Cylon seen, Caprica Six had a two-year relationship with Baltar on Caprica, during which she used him to gain access and plant the backdoors in Colonial military network software which enable the total success of the initial Cylon attack.  She sacrifices her body to save Baltar's life from a blast wave of that Cylon attack.  She then exists for the rest of the series in Baltar's imagination as his "Inner Six," in addition to returning in corporeal form which is then known by the nickname "Caprica Six."

Caprica Six has a love-hate relationship with Baltar, alternately defending him to other Cylon models or leaving him to suffer at their hands.

A reincarnation of Caprica Six commits the first incident of Cylon-on-Cylon violence, killing a Three with a rock to save Anders's life.

Caprica Six was imprisoned on Galactica after helping Athena escape from the Cylons with Hera. She offers to testify against Baltar. While in the brig, she has a relationship with Saul Tigh. This results in the first Cylon-Cylon pregnancy in 2,000 years, which ends in a miscarriage.

Caprica Six has an "Inner Baltar" which only she sees, similar to how Baltar has an "Inner Six" that only he can see; Inner Baltar serves as a sort of conscience for Caprica Six and as an advisor in times of trouble, as Inner Six does for him. Inner Baltar appears at least once to Baltar himself. Before their true nature is revealed, speculation rises that Baltar is a Cylon. Inner Baltar and Inner Six appear to Baltar and Caprica Six – all four sharing a moment together – as the first part of the revelation that the "Inners" are divine beings (referred to as "Angels") manipulating both the Colonials and Cylons into fulfilling "God's plan" (series finale).

Shelly Godfrey 
Godfrey was on Galactica after the Cylon attack. She accused Baltar of treasonously sabotaging human defenses, and therefore of killing several million people (Six Degrees of Separation). She also appears in Battlestar Galactica: The Plan TV movie.

Gina Inviere 
Gina acted as a contractor for Pegasus and was in a relationship with Admiral Cain. When Cain discovered that Gina was a Cylon agent, she ordered her crew to "push her programming" in an attempt to see if Gina was vulnerable to emotional trauma. Gina later escaped with Baltar's aid, assassinated Cain and founded a resistance group in the fleet, preaching peace with the Cylons. While it seemed that Gina developed feelings for Baltar and wanted to pursue him, she detonated a nuclear warhead (provided by Baltar) that destroyed Cloud Nine, other fleet ships and generated an electromagnetic signature, the detection of which ultimately led the Cylon fleet to New Caprica.

Sonja and Natalie 
Other important Sixes include Natalie, who originally leads the rebel Cylon faction against Cavil's faction before she is killed by Athena in a misunderstanding, and Sonja, who was elected to represent the rebel Cylons in the Colonial fleet's Quorum of Ships' Captains.

Sixes are played by Tricia Helfer.

Number Seven (Daniel) 
Daniel was the seventh Cylon model ("No Exit"). Ellen refers to Daniel as an "artist, and so sensitive to the world". She was very close to Daniel, which enraged Cavil; he felt that Daniel was Ellen's favorite and became jealous. Cavil poisoned the amniotic fluid used to mature the Daniel copies and then corrupted Daniel's genetic code. This sabotage meant that no further Sevens could be created. The original was also killed with Sam Anders stating at one point that "Daniel died" after regaining his true memories.

Fans speculated that Starbuck or her father was a version of the corrupted Seven line. Instead Daniel is merely a plot device to explain the missing number and to expand on Cavil's character (noting that Daniel is essentially the Abel to Cavil's Cain). The Sevens were a springboard for Caprica, where Daniel Graystone is the name of a main character played by Eric Stoltz; this Daniel is the creator of the Colonial Centurions.

Sevens are never seen in the series, and their physical appearance is never described.

Number Eight (Sharon "Boomer" Valerii / Sharon "Athena" Agathon) 
At the end of the miniseries, a Six says "By your command" to an Eight. This phrase is usually spoken to the Imperious leader in the old series by Centurions. It seemed to give this particular Eight a leadership role. Eights also appear to be designed to be extremely beautiful, to seduce as a sleeper agent. But Eights have been noted to actually fall in love by personal choice with humans. This theme has been seen throughout the series and DVD movies produced after.

Boomer 
Sharon "Boomer" Valerii first appears as a Raptor pilot aboard the Galactica. Her true nature as a Cylon was revealed at the end of the miniseries. She acted as a sleeper agent, unaware of her true nature and programmed to carry out attacks on the fleet without realizing what she is doing. She was revealed to be an Eight in the episode "Downloaded".

Athena 
The other significant Eight, Sharon "Athena" Agathon, married Karl "Helo" Agathon, rebelled against the Cylons and joined forces with the Colonials. Her child with Helo, a daughter named Hera, is the first Cylon/human hybrid. Such a child is the subject of a Cylon prophecy. Its importance increased as it was a "child born of love". Shortly after Hera's birth, Roslin decides to mislead the Cylons into believing the child has died. Her plan involves lying to Athena and Helo, and giving the child to an adoptive mother, Maya. While aiding the Colonials in their plan to rescue the humans on New Caprica, Athena sneaks into a Cylon storage facility and steals launch codes for the civilian ships trapped on New Caprica. She is discovered by D'Anna, who informs her that Hera is still alive, citing strange dreams and a prophecy by a human mystic as proof. Athena, believing this to be a ruse, kneecaps D'Anna. During the exodus from New Caprica, Hera's caregiver is killed and D'Anna finds the baby. Boomer later tells Athena that Hera lives. Athena has Helo kill her (Athena), allowing her to download into a new body within the Cylon fleet. With the help of Caprica Six, she rescues Hera and returns to Galactica.

Eight is described as "weak" by Baltar's Head Six, and Eights usually appear more compassionate and sympathetic than other Cylons. However, they fully supported the destruction of the Colonies. The actions of Boomer and an Eight who had a duplicitous affair with Felix Gaeta on New Caprica make it clear that Eights are capable of homicide and betrayal. Eights are also capable of intense loyalty and have the ability to break from Cylon traditions and laws to help human friends or family. They vote to save humanity in the Cylon civil war that Boomer starts. She hesitates for a while when Cavil influences her, but in the end chooses to support the humans, even if it means that she must give up her life.

Athena becomes completely assimilated in human culture. Her child and husband become her life's focus. She is the only Cylon to create a family. The Eights' perceived fragility camouflage great strength and direction. In one episode, Athena hardwires herself to Galactica, hacks into a Cylon fleet and shuts them down.

Eights are played by Grace Park.

Final Five  
The "final five" Cylons are the last five survivors of the earliest identified race of Cylons. Approximately 4,000 years prior to the events of the show, humans on Kobol developed artificial intelligence, which became the original race of Cylons. This race rebelled and fought in a war against the twelve tribes of humans. While the exact details are not revealed in the show, the two sides eventually reached a resolution and departed Kobol. Religious records at the time described this race as the "thirteenth tribe" and identified that they traveled to a planet they named (the first) "Earth". This race self-evolved to look human, eventually losing the ability to resurrect mechanically in favor of biological reproduction. Because of their common Kobolian ancestry, this "thirteenth tribe" kept their own records and religious history, which shared some of the prophetic events outlined in Colonial scriptures; in particular, the departing thirteenth tribe created the "Temple of [the] Five" on their way to "Earth", and the Final Five returned to it on their way back, with Colonial texts predicting its creation and third visitation by the Humans and Cylons within the series.

Approximately 2,000 years prior to the events of the show, this race of "human" Cylons eventually tried to create a new race of artificially intelligent Cylons as a subservient race, only for them to, in turn, rebel and commit a nuclear war on "Earth". The "final five" were scientists researching resurrection technology, and escaped by downloading into copies of their bodies stationed in orbit. Realizing their mistakes and that the twelve tribes would eventually repeat this mistake, they fled "Earth" using a sub-light starship and spent the next 2,000 years traveling to the settlements of the 12 colonies in hibernation. They arrived in the Twelve Colonies during the peak of the Cylon rebellion, approximately 40 years prior to the start of the show. In conferring with their distant "cousins", the Cylon Centurions, they proposed an exchange of technology to accelerate the transformation of the new race of Cylons into biological forms and resurrection technology; additionally, they shared their history and religious knowledge, though did not interfere with the Centurians' emerging monotheism, ensuring that newer Cylons had knowledge of both. The Centurions agreed and ended the war with humanity, retreating to rebuild and learn from the final five, eventually building and programming the humanoid Cylons which were each given a production number: One (Cavil), Two (Leoben), Three (D'Anna), Four (Simon), Five (Aaron), Six (various names), Seven (Daniel) and Eight (Sharon).

Over time, Cavil gained influence and betrayed his creators, the "final five". He killed their physical bodies and "boxed" their personalities. Later he resurrected them periodically, purged their memories and sent them to live among the humans, hoping each would become disillusioned with being "human" and eventually reject the morality, philosophy, and religion used to inform their construction of the younger Cylons. The other six models had no knowledge of the Final Five's identities, presumably blocked by Cavil, though they were aware of the existence of five absent models who were not to be spoken of. When D'Anna (a Three) attempts to learn their identities, Cavil boxes her entire model line as punishment. In the final episode of the third season, four of the final five are revealed to be characters with long histories on the Galactica. Their purpose, and how and why they were hidden from the rest of their kind, is a major plot point of the fourth and final season when Ellen Tigh is revealed to be the fifth member.

Backstory 
The named, "human", Cylon models initially refer to the five with reverence; it soon become clear that they are programmed to avoid thinking directly about the five, as their identities are hidden, even from Cylons. Circumventing this programming kills a model three shortly after her revelation, and a model one, Cavil, puts her consciousness into cold storage after resurrection to prevent her from discussing the discovery ("Rapture").

They were the original humanoid Cylons, born 2,000 years before the series, on Earth, as part of the Thirteenth Tribe. They were born to Cylon parents through sexual reproduction, rather than built. They were the researchers who rebuilt the Cylon resurrection technology that had been abandoned when the Thirteenth Tribe gained the ability to procreate. Saul and Ellen were married at the time, while Tyrol and Foster were in love and planned to marry ("No Exit").

While on Earth the Final Five learned of the upcoming attack on the Colonies from beings ("Angels") only they can see. They placed the resurrection technology on a ship in Earth orbit. When the nuclear attack kills them, they resurrect on the ship and head for the Colonies to warn them. They arrive during the First Cylon War, unbeknownst to the humans, and make a deal with the Centurions: stop the war and they will help them build human bodies. They build the first model, One (Cavil), who helps them build seven other models.

Cavil then kills and boxes the Five and removes the memory of their identities from the other Cylons. He later unboxes them, replacing their memories. Cavil periodically seeds them among the human populations starting with Saul, and then Ellen, to show them the evils of humanity.

The Five are fully Cylon – although "fundamentally different" from the others. Unlike the other models, they do not have model numbers.

Other Cylons do not talk about the Five ("Torn").

Identities 
Saul Tigh (Michael Hogan) and Galen Tyrol (Aaron Douglas) are stationed aboard the Galactica, while Sam Anders (Michael Trucco) is an athlete on Caprica. Tory Foster (Rekha Sharma) is a political operative who is rescued from Caprica and works for Roslin. Ellen Tigh (Kate Vernon), is the fifth member, as Saul later realizes ("Sometimes a Great Notion") as more of his memory returns. Ellen resurrected after she is poisoned by Saul for giving away details of the group's rescue mission plan to Cavil on New Caprica. This restores her memory of her life as a Cylon ("No Exit").

Story 
The Five awaken when they begin to hear strange music. This seems to affect other Cylons. A Raider scans Anders and disengages an attack. Aboard Galactica, Caprica Six tells Roslin that she can feel the Final Five and that they are near. ("He That Believeth In Me") Twos, Sixes and Eights believe that the Raiders called off the attack because they sensed the Final Five, something with which the Ones, Fours and Fives disagree. This disagreement leads directly to the Cylon Civil War, in which the Twos, Sixes, and Eights rebel ("Six of One"). A standoff between Galactica and the rebel Baseship exposes the four as Cylons to the humans, but Lee Adama, in his capacity as acting President, grants them amnesty as part of an alliance ("Revelations").

Only Anders and Ellen regain their complete memories: when Anders gets shot in the head, it seems to break Cavil's block on his memory, while Ellen's resurrection restores all of her memories. Cavil had planned for the Five to die in the destruction of the Colonies, download, regain their true memories and apologize for their faith in humanity (The Plan). Instead, four of the Final Five survive the destruction of the Colonies without resurrecting (Tigh and Tyrol were on Galactica and Tory and Anders survived through luck) while Cavil kept Ellen alive so she could suffer more and learn her "lesson". Cavils' plan thus fails, as all of the Five (with the possible exception of Foster) maintain their loyalty to humanity.

They play a major role in ending the second war, taking a prominent role in the Battle of The Colony, especially Anders who acts as Galactica's Hybrid and shuts down the Colony's weapons and Hybrids. The Five also nearly bring a peace between human and Cylon by exchanging resurrection technology (which can only be rebuilt by the combined knowledge of the Five) for peace.

They see each other's memories and Tyrol learns that Tory had murdered his wife. In a rage, he strangles her, shattering the temporary peace, although a fortuitous nuclear explosion and Cavil's subsequent suicide effectively ends the war moments later.

After escaping and reaching a new Earth, Anders flies the fleet into the Sun, destroying it and himself, leaving only three of the Final Five alive.

Hybrids 
The Hybrids resemble human beings inside an immersion tank similar to a Cylon rebirthing tank. The Hybrids are cyborgs, consisting of conduits and other connectors mated to biological elements. The Hybrid is not one of the "thirteen models". It represents a step on the path from mechanical Centurion, to partially bio-mechanical Raider, to Hybrid, to skinjob. Hybrids are so integrated into the basestar's functionality that they are, for all practical purposes, its brains.

Hybrids continually speak what most of the humanoid Cylons consider to be gibberish, although there is some difference of opinion on this point. Many Cylons believe a hybrid's conscious mind is completely mad and the functions it performs are part of a deeper state of mind in connection with the ship. Caprica Six states that the Conoy model believes that every word a hybrid says is channeled from the Cylon god. A Hybrid is not allowed to vote in the Cylon democratic process, though it sometimes objects to the resulting decisions, for example, leaving another basestar full of disease-infected Cylons to their fates.

One Hybrid, considered the First Hybrid in Cylon lore, was the result of experiments on humans during the First Cylon War and appears to be more coherent and prophetic than the others. It went rogue as early as the end of the First War, and is protected by model 0005 Cylons called Guardians, who consider it their god. According to the skinjobs, the First Hybrid and its Guardians are legends. The Colonial Fleet accidentally clashes with the Guardians, destroying them, the First Hybrid along with its basestar. The First Hybrid has the appearance of an old man, whereas the standard Hybrids look like young women and are identical.

After he is shot in the head and enters a vegetative state, Sam Anders is connected to a datastream and as a result develops Hybrid-like abilities, whereupon he acts as Galactica's Hybrid. When hooked up, he speaks and acts like a Hybrid. This shows that apparently under special circumstances, normal Cylons, or at least the Final Five, can become Hybrid-like beings.

The Basestar Hybrids are played by Tiffany Lyndall-Knight. The First Hybrid is played by Campbell Lane.

Religion 
Humanoid Cylons, except for the Cavil models, follow a monotheistic religion. Religious fanaticism partially motivates their attempted genocide of humanity. Despite their origins the Cylons believe themselves to be spiritual beings. This monotheism seems to share some of the characteristics as the Abrahamic religions: belief that God is omniscient, omnipotent, omnibenevolent, that he will one day deliver divine retribution and that he intervenes in the mundane world. Their beliefs are different from the Abrahamic religions in that they deal with issues such as consciousness, enlightenment and reincarnation.

Moore said that this spirituality comes when a species becomes sentient and self-aware – questioning faith and religion and about what happens after death.

The different Cylon models have slightly different ways of talking about and dealing with their god, reflecting the different aspects of humanity that each Cylon model reflects. Ones do not all believe in God and can be agnostic or atheist. In contrast, Twos are fanatically religious.

Vulnerabilities 
Cylons are physically stronger and more resilient than humans. While this is obvious with respect to Centurions, the extent to which the Twelve are also is unclear. In the miniseries, William Adama fought with a Two who, despite suffering from radiation poisoning, proved to be stronger. The Two managed to break a metal pipe off of a plumbing fixture to use as a club, and lift Adama off the floor with one arm. Another Two was able to break apart a pair of metal handcuffs while under interrogation ("Flesh and Bone"). A Six engaged Kara Thrace hand-to-hand and proved to be exceptionally fast, agile and strong ("Kobol's Last Gleaming II"). Despite this, Cylons are (slightly less) vulnerable to most of the same things as humans. The Two who fought Adama was beaten to death with a flashlight, while the Six who fought Thrace was impaled by a piece of rebar. While the Twelve exceed human strength, they do not possess superhuman powers or resilience. Cylon skin appears just as vulnerable to breaking as human skin, bleeding just as a comparable wound would in a human.

Cylons' mental faculties are sufficiently similar to those of a human to allow for manipulation. Cain and Thrace exploited this fact while "interrogating" Cylons. The experience of death (even ameliorated by resurrection) is traumatic and can leave deep emotional damage.

Cylons are susceptible to an ancient virus that can be transmitted by rodents to which humans are immune, lymphocytic encephalitis. This virus was carried on a beacon left by the Thirteenth Tribe at the Lion's Head Nebula millennia before and disrupts all organic Cylon technology including Raiders, Hybrids (which in turn disrupts Centurions) and the skinjobs. The humans speculate that the beacon was accidentally contaminated when someone sneezed. The Cylons believe that a critical symptom of this virus, a harmful bioelectric feedback, can be transmitted during a download and attempt to prevent infected Cylons from downloading. The only immune Cylon is Athena, who had given birth to a half-human child and thus "inherited" human antibodies from her offspring (although it is unclear whether she retained this immunity after downloading).

Dr. Cottle developed a vaccine after some Cylons were infected on a basestar near the Lion's Head Nebula. The disease requires regular booster shots to keep an infected Cylon healthy. The Cylons failed to develop a cure or a permanent vaccine to the virus.

Cylons' silica pathways are affected by certain forms of radiation, such as that surrounding Ragnar Anchorage. It is assumed but not stated that this radiation affects all of the skinjobs as the station was chosen as a refuge by Commander Adama before he learned of the existence of biomechanical models. The radiation had deleterious effects on the Two they found at Ragnar Anchorage but not on Adama. This suggests that humans are not vulnerable to this type of radiation. However, it took some hours for the radiation exposure to have any significant impact on the Cylons, the Two observing that he was still able to walk and fight even after being on the station for several hours (although Adama expressed doubt about whether he could download in that state), and a Five on Galactica only manifested symptoms a short while after the fleet abandoned him on the station.

Plutonium was allegedly used for Baltar's Cylon Detector because its radiation affects humans and Cylons differently. The detector was dropped as a method of exposing hidden Cylons early in Season 2 as the revelation that Boomer (a test subject) was a Cylon convinced the command staff that the detector did not work.

In other media
Cylons have made appearances in other media besides tv series and movies, including novels, comic books, and a video game.

Novels
 In the novelization of the series pilot, the Cylons are described as a militaristic, reptilian race which has been conquering its way across the galaxy. The novelization is written by Glen Larson, the series creator, who originally intended the Cylons to be an alien species; and, in fact, dialog which was later edited out of "Saga of a Star World" illustrated this point. However, network censors were concerned about violence, so the Cylons became robots. By this time, two novels had been written describing the Cylons as multibrained aliens, so the Cylon Drone was invented to justify all the robots dying on-screen. As living, organic beings, the original Cylon troops could be promoted through the surgical implantation of a second brain. When a Cylon was elevated to Imperious Leader, he received a third brain.
 The novelization of the original series states that an elite class of Command Centurions act as executive officers to the Imperious Leader and are not subordinate to the IL-Series. In the TV series they are distinguished from other Command Centurions by black bands on their gold armor and are very rarely seen. Vulpa was originally of this class but had been demoted and stationed on ice planet Arcta.
 In the later novelization of the original series it is stated that there is a class lower than the typical Centurion, that of the Cylon Drone. Although appearing identical to Centurions, Drones are robots, not capable of sophisticated independent thought—beyond following simple instructions to perform menial tasks.

Multibrain status and built-in lie detectors 
The Berkley book series also explored two other aspects of Cylon design. The first is the development of multiple brain status. This allows Cylons additional thinking and deductive abilities. The second is an unexplained talent for knowing when a human is lying, which was suggested in the episode "The Lost Warrior".

Presented in The Gun on Ice Planet Zero book, the second of the two novels written before the network insisted the Cylons become robots, their multibrain status is the surgical inclusion of an auxiliary brain, allowing for higher-level thinking abilities. The command centurion and garrison commander on planet Tairac, Vulpa, demonstrated this ability.

 Cylon centurions (the chrome soldiers) have single brain status.
 Command centurions have three brain status.
 Imperious leaders enjoy three or four brain status.
 IL-series Cylons, such as Lucifer and Specter, have second brain status.

Comic books
According to the Maximum Press comic of Battlestar Galactica, just prior to the start of The Thousand Yahren War, the Cylons's Imperious Leader made a deal with the mysterious and demonic Count Iblis (meaning "Satan" in the Arabic language) to betray his entire race in exchange for power that would allow him to "become like Count Iblis". Count Iblis, however, having lied about the process of "empowerment", instead changed the Imperious Leader into a cybernetic entity, more machine than organic being. Enraged, the Imperious Leader swore revenge and became more and more driven by conquest and warfare.

In the Realm Press comic, the Cylons were originally led by a ruthless, conquest and expansionism-driven emperor named Sobekkta, one of the original living Cylons, who were a race of intelligent humanoid reptiles.

In Battlestar Galactica # 16 Berserker! During a planetary search, Apollo, unfortunately comes across a lone Mark III prototype Cylon. This advanced Cylon is more creative and adaptive like humans in its strategy making the Mark III more capable to defeat humans. However, the existing Cylons deemed this advanced Cylon prototype more a threat to them due to its unquenchable megalomania to rule so they marooned him far from the Cylon empire until needed (if ever).

Video games
In 1978, Mattel Electronics released a handheld electronic LED game based on the series, where the player tries to defend Galactica from kamikaze Cylon Raiders.

In popular culture

 In television 
 The re-imagined series shows that the original Cylon models were extremely similar to the ones from the original series. In fact, actual props from the original were used in the display cases containing a Cylon Baseship and the upper torso and arms of a centurion.
 Two Cylon references can be witnessed in the Futurama series. In "Bendin' in the Wind", a Cylon is part of the musical duo Cylon and Garfunkel, a parody of Simon and Garfunkel. In "The Six Million Dollar Mon", Hermes has both a Cylon eye and a Cylon 'member' when in bed with his wife, LaBarbara.
 In the Farscape episode "I Shrink, Therefore I Am", Crichton's ship is invaded by a race with bioengineered exoskeletons. "This is John Crichton paging the head cylon, pick up the phone imperious leader."
 The classic Cylons have also appeared on The Simpsons on several occasions, the most notable in "Mayored to the Mob" during a sci-fi convention. There's a quick gag in a boxing arena where three Centurions square off against R2-D2 and C-3PO from Star Wars. ("See the mighty robots from Battlestar Galactica fight the gay robots from Star Wars!") They easily pin C-3PO to the floor, and R2 refuses to help.
 In the FOX animated series Family Guy, the host of "KISS Forum" also hosts "Battlestar Galactica Forum" on Quahog's Public-access television cable TV channel. He introduces the forum by putting a classic Centurion mask on and saying "Welcome to Battlestar Galactica Forum" in traditional Cylon computerized-monotone.
 Several Cylons appear briefly in the South Park epic Imaginationland, as one of the evil fictional creations set free when the barrier between the "good" and "evil" halves of the imagination is destroyed by terrorists.
 In the opening credits of certain seasons of The A-Team, Dirk Benedict watches a Cylon walk past (while at the Universal Studios tour), raises a finger and opens his mouth as if to say something, then gives up. Dirk Benedict played the character Starbuck in the original Battlestar Galactica series. This scene is later recreated on the animated show Family Guy.
 In a third season episode of Knight Rider, "Halloween Knight", the episode villain is shown briefly in a Cylon mask. Both series were created by Glen A. Larson.
 Cylons were the focus of a short skit on the Adult Swim program Robot Chicken, in which it is said that the original Cylon actors had so many problems walking around in their suits that they were constantly falling down.
 In The Replacements episode "Space Family Daring", Riley finds a head of a Cylon in a cabinet on board the spaceship.
 In SpongeBob SquarePants:
 In the episode "Plankton's Army", Plankton uses a robotic fish that features a revolving light over its "eyes" that is highly reminiscent of the Cylons' eyes.
 In another episode, "Komputer Overload", Plankton replaces his computer wife, Karen, with three robots made from random items lying around the Chum Bucket, one of which happens to be an old chrome-plated toaster, possibly meant to be a reference to the Colonials' nickname for the Cylon Centurions ("Toasters").
 In the CBS program The Big Bang Theory, the character Sheldon makes Cylon toast.
 In the ABC medical drama Grey's Anatomy, in season 12 episode 3, the character Maggie Pierce goes on a rant about being alone and references that her sister Meredith is a Cylon. Quote: "You're a cylon, this is Galactica".

 In other media 
 Several Cylon Centurians make an appearance as animatronics in the Alien Attack ride in Beverly Hills Cop 3.
 In the 2017 film Kingsman: The Golden Circle, Poppy's robot guard dogs have Cylon eye scanners.
 In the source code of Mozilla (and its Netscape predecessor), the indeterminate progress bar that slides back and forth—rather than rolling or filling up from left to right—is referred to as the "Cylon".
 A Cylon lookalike robot is featured in the official music video for Bloc Party's single, "Flux".
 In the video game Persona 3 one of the items the player can buy is a drink called "Cylon Tea", a pun on Ceylon tea.
 The album Programmed to Love by British electronica band Bent features the song "Cylons in Love".
 In the Dark Horse Star Wars comic series Tag and Bink, Cylons appear as the Emperor's Guards, Tag and Bink, in addition to many other references to other science fiction franchises.
 British comedians Mitchell and Webb parody the re-imagined series in a sketch in which the human crew fear that the ship has been infiltrated by "fracking machines", apparently oblivious to their clearly robotic colleague that orders oil in the staff canteen.
Larami came out with a bubble toy in 1978 called the Battlestar Galactica Cylon Bubble Machine as well as a line of other inexpensive toys.

References

External links

 Old "Cylons" at Battlestar Wiki
 New "Cylons" at Battlestar Wiki
 Humanoid Cylon at Battlestar Wiki

 
Fictional empires
Fictional extraterrestrial life forms
Fictional extraterrestrial cyborgs
Fictional extraterrestrial robots
Fictional mass murderers
Battlestar Galactica characters